Uyo is the capital city of Akwa Ibom in South South Nigeria.  Ibibio is the language spoken in Uyo.

It became the capital on September 23, 1987 when Akwa Ibom was created from the former Cross River State. According to the 2006 Nigerian Census, the population of Uyo (including Itu) is 427,873, while the greater urban area, including Uruan, has a population of 554,906.

Ibibio is the primary indigenous language. The main campus of the University of Uyo is in Nwaniba, with satellites on Ikpa Road.

Education 
 Christian Secondary Commercial School
 University of Uyo

Transportation 
 Railway stations in Nigeria

Sports 
Godswill Akpabio International Stadium

Religion 
 Roman Catholic Diocese of Uyo
 Uyo church collapse

Gallery

See also 
 Ibom Tropicana Entertainment Centre
 Chief Elijah Akpan Okon

References

 
Cities in Akwa Ibom State
State capitals in Nigeria
Local Government Areas in Akwa Ibom State